Kieran Christopher Lee (born 22 June 1988) is an English footballer who plays as a central midfielder for League One club Bolton Wanderers. He began his career with Manchester United.

Career

Manchester United
A central midfielder earlier in his career, he was deployed more often by Manchester United as a full back, either on the left or on the right. He signed for the club on a youth contract in July 2004, after impressing in the club's Under-17 team for the past two years. He continued to progress up the youth system, playing 25 times for the Under-18s in 2004–05, and making another 23 appearances in 2005–06. He also played in 16 matches for the Reserves that season, in various competitions.

His performances that season earned him a two-year professional contract with the club and, just three days after signing it, he was given his first taste of first team football, coming on as a second-half substitute for Wes Brown in Roy Keane's testimonial against Celtic at Old Trafford. In addition to this, he also made appearances in first team friendlies prior to the 2006–07 season, first coming on as a substitute for Phil Bardsley away to Preston North End, and then playing the full 90 minutes of a 2–1 victory over Macclesfield Town.

Lee's Reserve team performances were rewarded in the 2006–07 season by him being given the captain's armband. In between his 25 appearances for the Reserves that season, Lee also made his first team debut. He was named as a substitute in the League Cup Third Round tie against Crewe Alexandra and, with the score at 1–1, he came on for David Gray in the 77th minute. The match went to extra time and, with less than two minutes remaining, Lee made a charging run up from right back to latch onto an Alan Smith through-ball. He composed himself, and slid the ball coolly past Crewe's former Manchester United goalkeeper, Ben Williams.

This appearance was followed up by another in the Fourth Round of the League Cup, this time against Southend United. Lee came on for John O'Shea in the 75th minute, but was unable to rescue the team from a 1–0 loss. Towards the end of the season, United suffered a dearth of defenders, with Mikaël Silvestre, Patrice Evra, Gary Neville and Nemanja Vidić all out through injury at one time or another, so Lee was called into the squad for the matches against Milan and Everton, although he did not play in either game. He finally made his Premier League debut against Chelsea on 9 May 2007. Since the title race had been sewn up the game before, United manager Alex Ferguson was able to select a team of fringe players for the game, including Lee. At the end of the season, in recognition of his fine performances over the preceding 12 months, Lee was awarded the Denzil Haroun Reserve Team Player of the Year award.

On 12 December 2007, Lee was again named as a substitute for the Champions League game against Roma, but did not get to play. It was announced on 28 December 2007 that Lee would be joining Queens Park Rangers on loan from 2 January 2008. He would then be eligible to play for QPR against Chelsea in the FA Cup on 5 January.

Oldham Athletic
After spending four months on loan at QPR, making seven appearances, Lee became Oldham Athletic's first signing of summer 2008. Moving on a free transfer, Lee signed a two-year contract with the Latics, beginning on 1 July 2008. His first game with Oldham came in the League Cup second round in a 3–0 loss to Burnley. On 26 December, he made his league debut for Oldham in a 3–0 win versus Crewe Alexandra, assisting in the final goal by Lee Hughes.

His first goal for Oldham was a 95th-minute equaliser against Swindon Town on 22 August 2009, and after struggling to make an impression in the previous season, he appeared far more regularly from then on, becoming the regular choice at right back as the season progressed. He maintained this progress under new manager Paul Dickov, and for the rest of his career at Boundary Park he made the right back position his own. He signed a new one-year contract with Oldham Athletic on 4 March 2011. and on 27 April 2011, he won four Player of the Year awards for Oldham including Players' Player of the Year and Fans' Player of the Year, as well as the honours from Boundary Blues and Oldham Athletic Supporters Association.

Kieran Lee scored his first goal of the 2011–12 season against Chesterfield with a 25-yard strike to the bottom left hand corner in a 5–2 win for the Latics. He also dominated the end-of-season awards presentation in May 2012, again winning the Latics' 4 'Player of the Year' awards.

Sheffield Wednesday
On 28 May 2012, Lee signed a three-year deal with Sheffield Wednesday, after rejecting the offer of a new contract with the Latics.

In July 2019, he signed a new one-year contract with Sheffield Wednesday.

On 24 June 2020, he signed a one-month extension to cover the rest of the 2019–20 season which was delayed due to the coronavirus.

Bolton Wanderers

On 8 January 2021, Lee signed an 18-month contract with EFL League Two side Bolton Wanderers after spending the previous few weeks training at the University of Bolton Stadium. His made his debut 13 January 2021, starting and playing 71 minutes in a 1–1 draw against Exeter City. He scored his first goal in the 2-1 win against Walsall on 20 March. This was his first goal since scoring against Bolton for Sheffield Wednesday in October 2017. On 5 November, he signed a one year contract extension extending it to 2023.

Career statistics

Notes

Honours
Bolton Wanderers
EFL League Two third-place (promotion): 2020–21

Individual
Denzil Haroun Reserve Team Player of the Year: 2006–07

References

External links
 Kieran Lee biography at OldhamAthletic.co.uk
 

1988 births
Living people
People from Stalybridge
English footballers
Association football defenders
Manchester United F.C. players
Premier League players
Queens Park Rangers F.C. players
Oldham Athletic A.F.C. players
Sheffield Wednesday F.C. players
Bolton Wanderers F.C. players
Association football utility players
English Football League players